The year 2015 is the 234th year of the Rattanakosin Kingdom of Thailand. It was the 70th year in the reign of King Bhumibol Adulyadej (Rama IX), and is reckoned as year 2558 in the Buddhist Era.

Incumbents
King: Bhumibol Adulyadej 
Crown Prince: Vajiralongkorn
Prime Minister: Prayut Chan-o-cha
Supreme Patriarch: (vacant)

Events

January
 January 6 - Thai police arrest Gurmeet Singh convicted of involvement in a bombing in Chandigarh that killed 18 people in 1996, including Beant Singh who was then chief minister of Punjab.
 January 9 - Former Prime Minister of Thailand Yingluck Shinawatra appears to face impeachment charges over a failed rice subsidy scheme.
 January 23 - Thailand's military-appointed legislature votes to impeach former Prime Minister Yingluck Shinawatra for her role in overseeing a government rice subsidy program that lost billions of dollars.

February

March

April
 April 2 - Thailand's junta escalates their control from martial law to absolute power.

May
 May 24 - 2015 Rohingya refugee crisis
 Malaysian authorities find mass graves at the border to Thailand of the Rohingya refugees fleeing Burma.
 May 25 - 2015 Rohingya refugee crisis
 Malaysia's discovery yesterday is said to have 139 graves with some of them having more than one body in.
 May 29 - 2015 Rohingya refugee crisis
 Thailand will allow American authorities to identify boats that carry refugees from Burma and Bangladesh by using surveillance planes.

June
 June 2 - 2015 Rohingya refugee crisis
 A Thai general is suspended after the police order his arrest on suspected human trafficking.

July

August
 August 17 - Bombing in Ratchaprasong, Bangkok, killing 19.

September
 September 7 - A bolide over Bangkok and other locations flared up for several seconds in early morning.

October

November

December

Births

Deaths

See also
 2015 in Thai television
 List of Thai films of 2015

References

 
Years of the 21st century in Thailand
Thailand
Thailand
2010s in Thailand